Cordia dichotoma is a species of flowering tree in the borage family, Boraginaceae, that is native to the Indomalayan realm, northern Australia, and western Melanesia. 

Common names include fragrant manjack, snotty gobbles, cummingcordia, glue berry, anonang, pink pearl, bird lime tree, and Indian cherry in English; booch, लसोड़ा (lasoda), or gunda in Hindi; ਨਸੂੜੇ (lasoore) in Punjabi lasura in Nepali; गुंदा gunda in Gujarati; भोकर bhokar in Marathi; and 破布子 (phoà-pò·-chí), 樹子仔, or 樹子; ಚಳ್ಳೆ ಹಣ್ಣು challe hannu in Kannada; బంకనక్కర Bankanakkera in Telugu, nunang in Malay and Minangkabau, nonang in Maranao, and anúnang in Cebuano.

Description
Cordia dichotoma is a small to moderate-sized deciduous tree with a short bole and spreading crown. The stem bark is greyish brown, smooth or longitudinally wrinkled. Flowers are short-stalked, bisexual, white in colour which open only at night. The fruit is a yellow or pinkish-yellow shining globose which turns black on ripening and the pulp gets viscid.

Habitat and range
Cordia dichotoma is native to China (Fujian, Guangdong Guangxi, Guizhou, southeast Tibet, and Yunnan) the Ryukyu Islands of Japan, Taiwan, India, Pakistan, Sri Lanka, Cambodia, Laos, Burma, Philippines, Thailand, Vietnam, Indonesia, Malaysia, Papua New Guinea, Australia (Northern Territory and Queensland) and New Caledonia. It is a tree of tropical and subtropical regions. It is found in a variety of forests ranging from the dry deciduous forests of Rajasthan to the moist deciduous forests of Western Ghats and tidal forests in Myanmar.

Ecology
The larvae of the butterfly Arhopala micale feed on leaves of C. dichotoma.

Uses
The immature fruits are pickled (see South Asian pickles) and are also used as a vegetable fodder. The leaves also yield good fodder. The seed kernel has medicinal properties. It is often cultivated for its fruits throughout the range of its natural distribution.

Symbolism
It is the symbol of Phra Nakhon Si Ayutthaya Province in Thailand.

References

dichotoma
Australasian realm flora
Indomalayan realm flora
Flora of the Northern Territory
Flora of Queensland
Trees of Papua New Guinea
Trees of New Caledonia
Plants used in traditional Chinese medicine
Plants described in 1786